Séverine Amiot (born 17 October 1979 in Dijon, France)  is a French paracanoeist who has competed since the late 2000s. She won a bronze medal in the K-1 200 m TA event at the 2010 ICF Canoe Sprint World Championships in Poznań.

References

2010 ICF Canoe Sprint World Championships women's K-1 200 m TA results. - accessed 20 August 2010.

1979 births
French female canoeists
Living people
Sportspeople from Dijon
ICF Canoe Sprint World Championships medalists in paracanoe
Paracanoeists of France
TA classification paracanoeists
20th-century French women
21st-century French women